Henry Lee Prather (October 10, 1886 – September 23, 1964) was an American football and basketball coach. He served as the head football coach at the Southwestern Louisiana Industrial Institute for one season in 1912, compiling a record of 3–4. He is best known, however, for his tenures as the head football and men's basketball coach at Northwestern State University in Natchitoches, Louisiana.

Prather coached the Demons' football team between 1913 and 1917, and again from 1919 through 1933. The 1918 season was canceled because of World War I. In 20 seasons as coach at NSU, Prather compiled an overall record of 80–55–15. Including his one season at SLII, his overall football record was 83–45–15.

As the head basketball coach at NSU, Prather's tenure was very interrupted. He was the on-again, off-again coach seven different times. Basketball had not quite become as established as a sport as football in the United States, so he alternated many of the years with having no program at all. In his 35 total years as the school's coach, Prather accumulated an overall record of 473–169. He stepped down in 1950 to become Northwestern State University's president in 1951. He is still the all-time leader in victories for men's basketball by more than 300 wins to the second-closest coach, Red Thomas, who compiled 138 between 1950 and 1957.

Northwestern State's basketball arena, Prather Coliseum, is named in his honor.

Head coaching record

Football

Basketball

References

External links
 

1886 births
1964 deaths
Basketball coaches from Louisiana
Louisiana Ragin' Cajuns football coaches
Northwestern State Demons and Lady Demons athletic directors
Northwestern State Demons basketball coaches
Northwestern State Demons football coaches
Presidents of Northwestern State University
People from Odessa, Missouri
Sportspeople from Lafayette, Louisiana
Sportspeople from Natchitoches, Louisiana
20th-century American academics